The Distrito Nacional (D.N.) is a subdivision of the Dominican Republic enclosing the capital Santo Domingo. It is not in any of the provinces, but in practice, it acts as a province on its own. Before October 16, 2001, the Distrito Nacional was much larger, including what is now known as Santo Domingo Province. Published statistics and maps generally show the former, larger, Distrito Nacional. The Distrito Nacional has no rural or underdeveloped  areas.

Points of interest

Poligono Central

The Poligono Central is the central area of Santo Domingo. Upscale neighborhoods of Naco, Piantini, and Paraiso are located within this central polygon. Most of the financial activity in Santo Domingo is also located in the Poligono.

Central Government

The Distrito Nacional houses the central government's executive branch Presidential Office (Palacio Nacional), the national congressional building (Congreso Nacional) and the top judicial court building (Suprema Corte de Justicia). It also houses all the nationwide public office's main buildings, called Ministerios (formerly Secretarías de Estado).

Ciudad Colonial
For the main article, please select Ciudad Colonial.

The Ciudad Colonial (lit. "Colonial City") is the oldest continually occupied European settlement in the Western hemisphere, established by Bartholomew Columbus and the Spanish explorers in the New World. It has several historic landmarks and is declared as World Heritage Site by the UNESCO.

Nightlife
There are various nightlife activities available inside the Distrito Nacional. Upscale nightclubs, casinos, hotels, restaurants with international bars are widely available. Discothèque DJs and live performances caters both local sounds (merengue, salsa or bachata) and dance music (house, techno, trance, reggaeton, drum and bass, etc.) Most nightclubs alternate between the two main genres; some other clubs stick almost exclusively to either one. Several chain restaurants are available serving dinner up to midnight. Most restaurants within hotels don't close at all, and the majority of casinos serve complimentary snacks all night. Most restaurants are specialized on the following cuisines: Local, Italian, French, Steakhouse, Mexican, Spanish, Seafood, Chinese and Japanese). There are several movie cinemas that play movies in English (with subtitles) and are on par with worldwide premiers. Jazz music outlets, live theater, live concerts and sports events are available throghtout the whole week.

Parks
Distrito Nacional has several urban parks, the largest one, Parque Mirador Sur, overlooking the Caribbean Sea from a high cliff from the Avenida Mirador Sur (also called Avenida de la Salud - Health Avenue). It has several miles of open road designed for picnic, jogging and cycling. Roller skating and even Kendo are regularly practiced in areas of the park.

Other places in the area include:
 Plaza de la Cultura Juan Pablo Duarte - which houses several national museums and is host of the International Book Fair. It houses the Teatro Nacional. The Orquesta Sinfónica Nacional holds concerts under the direction of Maestro José Antonio Molina.
 Centro Olímpico Juan Pablo Duarte - Olympic facility in the center of the city. It includes the Estadio Olímpico Félix Sánchez.
 Estadio Quisqueya - baseball stadium, home of two national teams: Tigres del Licey and Leones del Escogido. The former is the winningest team of the Caribbean Series.

Shopping
There are several shopping malls that represent international brands of clothing, electronic goods, gifts and the like. Banks, barber shops, internet cafés, travel agencies, dental offices and supermarkets can all be found under a single roof.

Schools
There are plenty of public (government funded) and private schools that offer teaching in both Spanish and English.  Among the public universities is the first university of the Americas, Universidad Autónoma de Santo Domingo, located near the center-south of the city. The first private university, Pontificia Universidad Católica Madre y Maestra, has a campus nearby.

Transportation

Metro de Santo Domingo

The Distrito Nacional boasts the first and only underground public transportation system in the country. The first line connects the Distrito Nacional with Santo Domingo Norte.

Public transportation
Other means of public transportation include: taxi services, public bus routes, urban transportation by bus, local airports and rent cars. International flights are handled by the nearby Las Américas International Airport and La Isabela airport.  It can be reached from the city center through some 20 miles of recently expanded expressway and new suspension bridge (Puente Presidente Juan Bosch).

Politics
The Distrito Nacional is represented in the Senate and the Chamber of Deputies on the same scale as a Province (a single Senator (Senador), plus one Deputy (Diputado) per 50,000 inhabitants). Its local government is the same as the provincial municipios, without the equivalent of a provincial tier of government.

Sectores (neighborhoods)

The Distrito Nacional is subdivided in incorporated areas (neighborhoods) called sectores which could be considered as small urban towns. All sectores are serviced directly by the municipal mayor's office (Alcalde).

Some sectores prefixes:
 Ciudad (city) - applies to the original older parts of town, some dating back to colonial times of Dominican Republic.
 Ensanche (lit. "widening") - usually, but not always, applied to the more "modern" parts of the city.
 Villa - the urban outskirts of both the old city of Santo Domingo and the current (smaller) Distrito Nacional.

See also

References

External links
  Oficina Nacional de Estadística, Statistics Portal of the Dominican Republic
  Oficina Nacional de Estadística, Maps with administrative division of the provinces of the Dominican Republic, downloadable in PDF format
  "Barrios y sub-barrios del Distrito Nacional", City Council of the National District

 
Provinces of the Dominican Republic
States and territories established in 1932
Capital districts and territories